Linda Salzman is an American artist and writer.

Biography
Salzman created the artwork for the plaque on the Pioneer spacecraft and coproduced the Voyager Golden Record.

She co-authored the book Murmurs of Earth with her husband, astronomer Carl Sagan, whom she married on April 6, 1968; the marriage lasted until their divorce in 1981.

Salzman is the mother of author and screenwriter Nick Sagan.

See also
NASA Ames Research Center

References

Living people
Interstellar messages
American women television writers
American television writers
Place of birth missing (living people)
Sagan family
American Jews
Carl Sagan
Year of birth missing (living people)